Hurricane Allen was a rare and extremely powerful Cape Verde hurricane that affected the Caribbean, eastern and northern Mexico, and southern Texas in August 1980. The first named storm and second tropical cyclone of the 1980 Atlantic hurricane season, it was the fifth most intense Atlantic hurricane on record in terms of barometric pressure, behind Hurricane Rita, the 1935 Labor Day hurricane, Hurricane Gilbert, and Hurricane Wilma. It was one of the few hurricanes to reach Category 5 status on the Saffir–Simpson Hurricane Scale on three occasions, and spent more time as a Category 5 than all but two other Atlantic hurricanes. Allen is the only hurricane in the recorded history of the Atlantic basin to achieve sustained winds of 190 mph (305 km/h), thus making it the strongest Atlantic hurricane by wind speed. Until Hurricane Patricia in 2015, these were also the highest sustained winds in the Western Hemisphere. Hurricane Allen was also the second strongest tropical cyclone to hit the Gulf of Mexico, with the strongest being Hurricane Rita.

Throughout its life, Allen moved through the deep tropics on a westerly to northwesterly course through the tropical Atlantic Ocean, Caribbean Sea, and Gulf of Mexico before making its final landfall near the United States–Mexico border. At peak strength, it passed near Haiti, causing hundreds of deaths and heavy damage. After crossing the Gulf of Mexico, Allen weakened as it struck the lower Texas coast, causing high winds, a significant storm surge, and heavy rainfall, which caused damage to southern Texas. Overall, Allen killed at least 269 people and left $1.57 billion in damages (1980 US dollars), mostly within the United States and Haiti. Because of its impact, the name Allen was retired from the six-year revolving list of Atlantic tropical cyclone names in 1981 and the name was replaced by Andrew. The name Andrew, though, was subsequently retired after the 1992 season's Hurricane Andrew. The remnants of the storm caused a brief lapse in the heat wave of 1980 in places like Dallas/Fort Worth, Texas, which had recorded 69 days of  heat.

Meteorological history

Allen was an early Cape Verde-type hurricane which originated from a tropical wave that previously moved off the African coastline on July 30. The system developed as it moved westward, becoming a tropical depression on August 1. Early on August 2, as the depression moved towards the Caribbean, it had intensified and became the first named storm of the season. The National Hurricane Center noted that conditions appeared favorable for further intensification. However, it was also noted that a large cold-low north of Puerto Rico was producing strong westerly wind shear, which would cause Allen to possibly encounter unfavorable conditions within 72 hours. By August 3, the National Hurricane Center retracted predictions of less favorable conditions from the cold-low north of Puerto Rico, since that weather system was weakening and moving westward.

At 1600 UTC on August 3, the National Hurricane Center upgraded Allen to hurricane status, as an Air Force plane recorded winds of 100 mph (155 km/h). However, in post-analysis, it was discovered that Allen had been a hurricane since 0000 UTC on August 3. Although the National Hurricane Center noted that conditions favored slow strengthening, Allen continued to rapidly intensify, and became a Category 4 hurricane only two hours after that advisory.

By August 5, Allen intensified into a Category 5 hurricane while south of Puerto Rico. This made Allen the earliest Category 5 hurricane in the Atlantic on record, but was later surpassed by Hurricane Emily which reached that intensity on July 16, 2005. Hence, the barometric pressure dropped by  less than 10 hours after the National Hurricane Center stated that the pressure would not decrease significantly within the time of 24 hours.

The eye passed between Hispaniola and Jamaica as a Category 4 hurricane. After friction with the mountains of Haiti and Jamaica had caused it to weaken, Allen intensified back to a Category 5 hurricane, retaining this intensity for over a day. It then moved past the islands of Cayman Brac and Little Cayman causing moderate damage on Cayman Brac with winds near 135 mph. During Allen's trek through the Caribbean Sea and the Gulf of Mexico, its center of circulation never crossed over land despite its close passage to various islands in and around the Caribbean sea.

In the day prior to landfall, a dry air mass in the western Gulf of Mexico caused the storm to weaken substantially. Landfall on the mainland was along the sparsely populated Texas coast somewhere between Laguna Vista and Port Mansfield. It became extratropical on August 11.

Preparations

As Allen approached the Caribbean Sea, gale warnings and a hurricane watch were issued for the islands of Barbados, St. Lucia, St. Vincent, Dominica, Grenada, Martinique, and Guadeloupe during the daylight hours of August 3. Gale warnings were in effect for Antigua from 11 am on August 3 until 11 am on August 4. Hurricane warnings were raised for Barbados, St. Vincent, St. Lucia, Martinique, and Dominica from the early afternoon of August 3 until the late morning of August 4. As Allen moved into the Caribbean sea, hurricane watches were issued for southeastern sections of the Dominican Republic and the southwestern peninsula of Haiti from 11 am on August 4 until the morning of August 5. Gale warnings were then in effect for the southern Dominican Republic from the night of August 4 into the night of August 5, while southern Haiti maintained the warnings from the night of August 4 into the morning of August 5. The hurricane watch was issued for Jamaica during the morning hours of August 5, while hurricane warnings were raised for the southwest peninsula of Haiti from the late morning of August 5 into the morning of August 6.  Hurricane warnings went into effect for Jamaica from around noon on August 5 until late in the afternoon of August 6. The Cayman Islands saw hurricane watches issued from the afternoon of August 5 into the morning of August 6 before the watches were upgraded to hurricane warnings from the morning until late afternoon of August 6.

As Allen approached the Gulf of Mexico, hurricane warnings were raised for the northeast Yucatán peninsula of Mexico from the afternoon of August 6 into the morning of August 8. Gale warnings were in effect for the Florida Keys from the evening of August 6 into the early morning of August 8. As Allen approached its final landfall, the northeast Mexican coast and Texas coast were placed under a hurricane watch from the morning of August 8 until the morning of August 9 for Mexico and the afternoon of August 9 for Texas. Hurricane warnings were posted for the Texas coast during the afternoon of August 8, and were lowered north of Freeport, Texas during the afternoon of August 9 and south of Freeport during the afternoon of August 10. Gale warnings and a hurricane watch were issued for the Louisiana coast from Vermilion Bay westward from the afternoon of August 8 into the afternoon of August 9. Hurricane warnings were in effect for northeast Mexico from the early afternoon of August 9 into the late afternoon of August 10. Hurricane warnings were downgraded to gale warnings between High Island, Texas and Freeport, Texas between the late afternoon of August 9 and the late afternoon of August 10. Hurricane watches were dropped for the Louisiana coast during the late afternoon of August 9. Hurricane warnings were downgraded to gale warnings for the lower Texas coast south of Freeport from the late afternoon of August 10 into the early morning of August 11.

Impact

Allen caused just over $1 billion (1980 USD) in damages and killed at least 269 people throughout its course (including indirect deaths).

Caribbean islands

In Barbados, preliminary damages were estimated to be $1.5 million (1980 USD). About 500 houses were either damaged or destroyed. No deaths were reported. St. Lucia sustained catastrophic damage from the strong category 3 hurricane. Eighteen people lost their lives as a result of the storm's passage. One death in Guadeloupe was attributed to Allen.

A coral reef at Discovery Bay, Jamaica was devastated by the wave action from the storm. Offshore Jamaica, greater numbers of smaller-sized Damselfishes was witnessed in the wake of Allen. Eight deaths in Jamaica were attributed to Allen. Damage was very significant along the northeast coast, where the hurricane made its closest approach to the island and created a  storm surge. Three deaths were attributed to Allen in Cuba.

Extensive damage occurred in Haiti due to high winds and flash flooding. Total costs for that country were estimated to be at more than $400 million (1980 USD). Roughly 60% of the nation's coffee crop was destroyed. In all, 220 people were killed and 835,000 were left homeless. In Port-au-Prince, 41 deaths were caused by tin roofs flying off and around 1200 were made homeless by flooding. Another 140 people were reported dead from flooding.

Mexico

Areas of northeastern Mexico saw heavy rains with the passage of Allen, with the highest totals exceeding . The hurricane earlier brushed the Yucatán Peninsula. As Allen only affected sparsely populated regions of Mexico, there were no reports of significant damage.

United States

Tropical storm-force winds in Corpus Christi, Texas blew roof gravel through the city, which led to substantial glass breakage to the 18-story Guarantee Bank Building and a 12-story wing of Spohn hospital. The storm caused seven deaths in Texas and 17 in Louisiana (most resulting from the crash of a helicopter evacuating workers from an offshore platform). Allen spawned several tornadoes in Texas. One tornado caused $100 million in damage when it hit Austin, Texas, making it the costliest tropical cyclone-spawned tornado in recorded history. Overall, however, the storm caused limited damage in the United States due to its suddenly diminished power and because its highest tides and winds hit a sparsely-populated portion of the Texas coast.

Retirement and records

Because of the destruction and extreme death tolls, the name Allen was retired from the Atlantic tropic storms list by the World Meteorological Organization in the spring of 1981, and will never again be used for a future Atlantic hurricane.  It was replaced with Andrew.

When Allen reached Category 5 intensity on August 5, it became the earliest Category 5 storm ever recorded. This record stood until Hurricane Emily surpassed it on July 16, 2005. Allen is one of three Atlantic hurricanes to reach Category 5 on the Saffir-Simpson hurricane scale on three occasions, the others being Hurricane Ivan and Hurricane Isabel. Allen also produced the fifth-lowest minimum pressure ever recorded in the Atlantic basin at 899 mbar (hPa) and was the strongest known hurricane in the basin, in terms of pressure, since 1935. Until then, it was the second strongest hurricane by pressure in the Atlantic Basin, but was since pushed down to fifth, and no hurricane has achieved  winds in this basin since then. It remains the most intense storm ever in August. Allen spent nearly 3 days as a Category 5 storm, initially the longest stretch of any previous Atlantic hurricane on record. However, a reanalysis of the 1932 Cuba hurricane showed that it spent 3 hours longer at Category 5 intensity than Allen, and Hurricane Irma in 2017 also spent slightly more time as a Category 5 hurricane than Allen. Five typhoons have spent longer as Category 5 storms, including most recently Karen and Nancy in the early 1960s.

See also

 List of Category 5 Atlantic hurricanes
 Hurricane Carla (1961) – Category 4 hurricane that took a similar path.
 Hurricane Beulah (1967) – Category 5 hurricane that took a similar path.
 Hurricane Emily (2005) – Category 5 hurricane that took a similar path.
 Hurricane Harvey (2017) – Category 4 hurricane that took a similar path.
 Hurricane Wilma (2005) - Category 5 hurricane that was the strongest in the Atlantic Ocean in terms of barometric pressure.

Notes

References

Further reading

External links

National Weather Service - Hurricane Allen
The Wake of Hurricane Allen in the Western Gulf of Mexico
Effects of Hurricane Allen on Buildings and Coastal Construction
Pertinent Meteorological Data for Hurricane Allen of 1980
KENS-TV (San Antonio) news footage from 1980 of the impact Allen had on Texas

Allen
Allen
Allen
1980 meteorology
1980 natural disasters
Allen
Allen
Allen
Allen
Allen
Allen
Allen
Allen
Allen
Allen
Allen
Allen
Allen
Allen
Allen
Allen
Allen
Allen
1980 in Cuba
1980 in Haiti
1980 in Mexico
1980 natural disasters in the United States
1980 in Texas
1980 in the Cayman Islands
1980 in the Caribbean
Allen